Vicellous Reon Shannon (born April 11, 1971) is an American actor known for his portrayal of Lesra Martin in the 1999 film The Hurricane, and Keith Palmer, the son of presidential candidate David Palmer in the Fox television series 24. Shannon also appeared in the 2006 film Annapolis.

Background 
Shannon was born in Memphis, Tennessee and raised in Orange County, California. He was a promising high school baseball player until he was sidelined by a severely injured hamstring. As a result, he took an interest in acting and began taking the two-hour bus ride to Laguna Beach where he studied drama, performing chores at the facility in lieu of tuition. His breakthrough role came a few years later in the television series Dangerous Minds.

Personal life 
He has two daughters, Sierra (b. 2000) and Serena (b. 2003).

Filmography

Film

Television

Radio 
Shannon recorded a public service announcement for Deejay Ra's 'Hip-Hop Literacy' campaign, encouraging the reading of Rubin 'Hurricane' Carter's autobiography.

References

External links

1971 births
Living people
African-American male actors
American male film actors
American male television actors
Male actors from Tennessee
21st-century African-American people
20th-century African-American people